Soul Avengerz is a British dance and techno group.

Biography 
They have worked with Javine Hilton to produce a single titled "Don't Let the Morning Come", showing Javine's new music style, before she went from R&B to perform dance music.

Discography 
 2002: "Comin' At Ya" - feat. Shena
 2006: "Sing" - feat. Angie Brown
 2006: "Don't Let the Morning Come" - feat. Javine Hilton: #49 UK, #1 UK Upfront Club Chart
 2009: "The Trumpets Shall Sound" with BUTCHERD BEATS

References

English techno music groups
English dance music groups